Trimbach railway station is a railway station in the municipality of Trimbach, in the Swiss canton of Solothurn. It is an intermediate stop on the summit branch of the Hauenstein line and is served by local trains only.

Services 
The following services stop at Trimbach:

 Basel S-Bahn : hourly service between Sissach and Olten.

References

External links 
 
 

Railway stations in the canton of Solothurn
Swiss Federal Railways stations